Catocala connexa is a moth of the family Erebidae. It is found in Japan.

The wingspan is 50–57 mm.

References

External links
Species info

connexa
Moths of Japan
Moths described in 1881